Kozyn is an urban-type settlement in Obukhiv Raion of Kyiv Oblast (province) of Ukraine. It hosts the administration of Kozyn settlement hromada, one of the hromadas of Ukraine. Population: .

Kozyn is situated on the rivers Dnieper and Kozynka, 25 km. to the south of Kyiv.

In Red Cavalry, Isaac Babel includes a one-page description of the Jewish cemetery in Kozyn. 'A cemetery in a Jewish shtetl. Assyria and the mysterious decay of the East on the weed-cluttered fields of Volyn.'

References

Urban-type settlements in Obukhiv Raion
Populated places on the Dnieper in Ukraine